Mirischia is a small (two meter-long) genus of compsognathid theropod dinosaur from the Albian stage (Early Cretaceous Period) of Brazil.

Discovery and naming
In 2000 David Martill and Eberhard Frey reported the find of a small dinosaur fossil present in a chalk nodule, illegally acquired by the German Staatliches Museum für Naturkunde Karlsruhe from an illegal Brazilian fossil dealer who had indicated the piece had been uncovered in the Chapada do Araripe, specifically at Araripina, Pernambuco. In 2004 the type species Mirischia asymmetrica was named and described by Martill, Frey and Darren Naish. The generic name combines the Latin mirus, 'wonderful', with "ischia", the Latinised plural of Greek ἴσχιον, ischion, 'hip joint'. The specific name asymmetrica refers to the fact that in the specimen the left ischium differs from its right counterpart.

The holotype, SMNK 2349 PAL, has its probable provenance in the Romualdo Formation of the Santana Group, dating from the Albian. It consists of a partial articulated skeleton, largely consisting of the
pelvis and incomplete hind limbs, including two posterior dorsal vertebrae, a rib, gastralia, partial ilia, pubes and ischia, partial thigh bones and the upper parts of the right tibia and fibula. In front of the pubes, a piece of a petrified intestine is present. The specimen represents a subadult individual.

Description
Mirischia was a small bipedal predator. Its length was in 2004 estimated at 2.1 metres. In 2010 Gregory S. Paul estimated the weight at seven kilogrammes. The holotype of Mirischia is notable for having asymmetrical ischia. Quoting from Naish et al. (2004): "The ischia of Mirischia are asymmetrical, that on the left being perforated by an oval foramen while that on the right has an open notch in the same position." The specimen is also unusual in that it preserves some soft tissue remains: apart from the intestine, what the describers interpreted to have been an air sac was preserved between its pubic and ischial bones in the form of a vacuity. Previous workers had suggested that non-avian theropods might — like birds — possess post-cranial air sacs, and Mirischia seems to confirm that. Another notable trait is the exceptional thinness of the bone wall of all skeletal elements.

Phylogeny
In 2004 Mirischia was assigned to the Compsognathidae, as closely related to Compsognathus from the Upper Jurassic of Europe and Aristosuchus from the Lower Cretaceous of England. It would then be the only compsognathid known from the Americas. In 2010 Naish suggested it may have instead been a basal member of the Tyrannosauroidea.

References

External links 
 The Theropod Database
 Tetrapod Zoology post on basal tyrannosauroids

Compsognathids
Albian life
Early Cretaceous dinosaurs of South America
Cretaceous Brazil
Fossils of Brazil
Romualdo Formation
Fossil taxa described in 2004
Taxa named by Darren Naish